Meat science is the study of meat, including its production, preparation and preservation.  Some meat scientists are studying methods of producing artificial meat such as cultures of muscle cells.

See also
 Flavorist

References

Meat